Clark Gillies (April 7, 1954 – January 21, 2022) was a Canadian professional ice hockey player. He played for the New York Islanders and Buffalo Sabres of the National Hockey League between 1974 and 1988. Gillies served as captain of the Islanders from 1977 to 1979, and won the Stanley Cup four years in a row with them, from 1980 to 1983. In 958 career games, Gillies recorded 319 goals, 378 assists, and 1,023 penalty minutes. He was elected to the Hockey Hall of Fame in 2002.

Early life
Gillies grew up in Moose Jaw, Saskatchewan. Once asked where his hometown is located, he famously joked, "Six feet from the moose's ass." Gillies started skating at around the age of four. His father insisted that Clark learn to skate and keep his balance before allowing him to bring a hockey stick onto the ice. He began playing ice hockey casually at the age of six and in organized leagues at the age of seven. He played with a local team in Moose Jaw until it ceased operation. As one of the bigger players on the ice, he was often engaged in fights with players on other teams, which he felt added to the fun of playing.

Playing career

Early career
Gillies' first professional sports experience was in baseball. In 1970, at 16, Gillies signed with the Houston Astros and played three years of minor league baseball in Covington, Virginia. He hit .241 in 86 games as a catcher/first baseman. He platooned at first base in 1972 with future Islander teammate Bob Bourne. Gillies suffered from homesickness and continued to play hockey during the off season. He eventually moved on to play in the Western Canada Hockey League with the Regina Pats. During his tenure with the Pats, Gillies accrued 570 penalty minutes in 201 games. In 1974, his final season for Regina, Gillies had 46 goals and 66 assists, was named to the league's First All-Star team, and the team won the 1974 Memorial Cup as Canadian major junior hockey champions.

Professional career
Later in 1974, the Islanders made Gillies their first-round selection in the 1974 NHL draft, taking him fourth overall. Gillies was also selected by the World Hockey Association's Edmonton Oilers in the WHA draft, but signed with the Islanders, making the team out of training camp. It was during his rookie season of 1974–75, in the playoffs, that Gillies established himself as one of the toughest players in the National Hockey League (NHL). enforcer Dave Schultz.

In the latter half of the 1976–77 season, Gillies was named team captain; however, in spite of Gillies' articulate speaking manner and amiable nature, he never felt completely comfortable as captain. Gillies captained the Islanders through two disappointing seasons, in part because the Islanders appeared to lack team toughness. During the pre-season of 1979–80 Gillies allowed Denis Potvin to take over as captain.

During the 1980 playoffs, Gillies got the best of Terry O'Reilly, one of the Boston Bruins' toughest players, several times, helping to fuel the Islanders' drive to the Stanley Cup. Gillies was used during this series as the Islanders' chief protector and enforcer, and in taking on this role, Gillies allowed his team to battle through a violent series with the Bruins. Gillies, now totally comfortable with his role with the team, flourished  individually and collectively, as the Islanders won the Stanley Cup in four consecutive years, from 1980 to 1983, during Gillies' tenure.

Gillies scored over 30 goals for four straight seasons (starting in 1975–76) as part of the "Trio Grande", the Islanders' top forward line with Mike Bossy and Bryan Trottier, and again in 1980–81 and 1981–82. In 1977 he finished tenth in the voting for the Hart Trophy for most valuable player in the NHL. In 1978 and 1979 he led all left-wingers for most votes for the All-Star game, and was named to the NHL First All-Star Team as a left-winger at the conclusion of these two seasons. In 1981, he played for the Canadian national team in the Canada Cup, scoring seven points in seven games.

After scoring only four goals in 55 games in 1985–86, Gillies was left unprotected in the NHL waiver draft, and was claimed by the Buffalo Sabres. While wearing number 39 in Buffalo, Gillies retired after playing a season and a half with the Sabres. On December 7, 1996, Gillies' No. 9 was retired by the Islanders.

Gillies was inducted into the Hockey Hall of Fame in 2002. Although his overall statistics were respectable but not considered Hall of Fame caliber, his role as an gressive playmaker (power forward) was key for Trio Grande linemates Bossy and Trottier to thrive, as was his clutch scoring ability (54 game-winning goals).

He was also inducted into the Saskatchewan Sports Hall of Fame.

Personal life and death
Gillies' nickname, "Jethro", came from teammate Ed Westfall, based on the character Jethro Bodine in the TV series The Beverly Hillbillies.

When Gillies, per tradition, got to have the Stanley Cup with him for 24 hours after the Islanders won it for the first time in 1980, he let his dog, a German shepherd, eat from it. "Why not?" he responded to critics. "He's a good dog."

Gillies, who was honoured by the Islanders on December 13, 2014, remained active in the Long Island community. He was a business development manager at Protective Wealth Consultants in Huntington, New York. He played in 30 to 40 charity softball games per year. He was inducted into the Suffolk Sports Hall of Fame on Long Island in the Hockey Category with the Class of 1998.

He was married to Pam, who is also from Moose Jaw. They lived in Greenlawn, New York. His son-in-law, Justin Bourne, is the son of his former teammate Bob Bourne, and worked as an assistant coach of the Toronto Marlies. His nephew, Colton Gillies, played in the NHL between 2008 and 2013. He was not related to Trevor Gillies, who also played for the Islanders.

Gillies died of cancer at his residence in Greenlawn on January 21, 2022, at the age of 67.

Career statistics

Regular season and playoffs

International

All statistics are taken from NHL.com.

Awards
 WCHL All-Star Team – 1974
 Stanley Cup champion – 1980, 1981, 1982, 1983
 NHL First All-Star Team - 1977-78, 1978-79

References

External links
 
 

 

1954 births
2022 deaths
Buffalo Sabres players
Canadian expatriate ice hockey players in the United States
Canadian ice hockey forwards
Covington Astros players
Edmonton Oilers (WHA) draft picks
Hockey Hall of Fame inductees
Ice hockey people from Saskatchewan
National Hockey League first-round draft picks
National Hockey League players with retired numbers
New York Islanders draft picks
New York Islanders players
Regina Pats players
Sportspeople from Moose Jaw
Stanley Cup champions
Deaths from cancer in New York (state)